"Vasile Lupu" High School Group (Romanian: Grupul de liceeni "Vasile Lupu") was one of the first organized anti-Soviet groups in Bessarabia in the wake of its occupation by the Soviet Union on June 28, 1940.

Activity
The resistance group was formed on 1 August 1940 by the students and some teachers of the Vasile Lupu high school in Orhei, which was renamed by the Soviets a Pedagogical School. The group, comprising about 32 members, had as its main goals the overthrow of Soviet power in Bessarabia and the reunification of Bessarabia with the Kingdom of Romania.

After a series of small actions, such as writing anti-Soviet slogans on public walls ("Death to the Stalinist occupiers!", "Go home, barbarians!", "Down with the executioner Stalin! Bessarabia to Bessarabians!", "Long live Romanian nation!"), and spread of anti-Soviet manifestos, they did an extrodinary achievement: during  Christmas night 1940, they took down the Soviet red flags, and put up Romanian flags on top of several buildings in Orhei, including City Hall, the Romanian Communist Party building, and the NKVD headquarters. In January 1941, the NKVD managed to crack into the organization and arrest most of its members. The sentence was pronounced on June 24, 1941.

Members 

Dumitru Avramoglo (born in 1922, in Puțintei), condemned to death
Victor Brodețchi (b. 1924), condemned to death
Anatol Cotun, condemned to death
Onisie Cozama (b. 1922), condemned to death
Dumitru Dobândă (b. 1922), condemned to death
Mihail Dobândă, condemned to death
Antol Duca (b. 1922), condemned to death
Vichentie Eprov (b. 1923), condemned to death
Haralambie Grăjdianu, condemned to death
Mihai Grăjdianu (b. 1922), condemned to death
Antol Gumă (b. 1922), condemned to death
Gheorghe Mihu (b. 1921), condemned to death
Constantin Sârbu, condemned to death
Most of them were executed by shooting in Chișinău on June 27, 1941, according to a report of the Odessa Military Tribunal, signed Axelrod. Other members of the group:
Vlad Alexeev, condemned, disappeared in Siberia
Ion Bacalu (b. 1924), condemned to 25 years imprisonment, died in detention
Pavel Boguș (b. 1924, in Mana), condemned to 25 years, died in detention
Eugen Brașoveanu (b. 1924), condemned to 25 years, died in detention
Serghei Buiuc (b. 1924), condemned to 10 years
Vsevolod Ciobanu, condemned to 10 years, disappeared in Siberia
Nicole Cuculescu (b. 1923), condemned to 20 years
Oleg Frunză (b. 1928, only 13 years old), condemned to 10 years
Victor Gumă (b. 1923), condemned to 25 years, died in detention
Maria Manjaru, teacher, condemned to 10 years for not denouncing, survived
Gheorghe Martânov (b. 1924), condemned to 25 years, freed in 1954
Dumitru Munteanu, teacher
Dumitu Stici, condemned to 10 years, disappeared in Siberia

The investigation was led by G. Goldberg, chief of the Orhei County Section of the NKVD, and was conducted by Konopekin, chief investigator, Terebilo, deputy, Cherepanov, Malinin, Morev, Nikitovich, Plotnikov, and Toporov, investigators.

Gallery

References

See also 
 Commission for the Study of the Communist Dictatorship in Moldova

Moldavian Soviet Socialist Republic
Clandestine groups
Anti-communist organizations
Anti-communism in Moldova
1940 establishments in Romania
Organizations established in 1940
1941 disestablishments in Romania
Political organizations based in Moldova
Soviet occupation of Bessarabia and Northern Bukovina
Organizations disestablished in 1941
Orhei
Paramilitary organizations based in the Soviet Union